East Likupang is a district in North Sulawesi, Indonesia, with a population of 15,905.

References